Willy Albert Flegel (born June 3, 1960) is a German-American medical researcher, geneticist, and physician who is best known for his work in the field of the Rh blood group. Flegel is the chief of the laboratory services section of the Department of Transfusion Medicine at the National Institutes of Health Clinical Center (NIH).

Early life and education 
Willy Flegel was born in Dieburg, Germany. He attended Johann Wolfgang Goethe Universität in Frankfurt am Main, Germany to study medicine, where he also obtained an M.D. by research. He trained as specialist for transfusion medicine at the Universität Ulm,  Germany and in molecular biology research at the University of California, San Diego. He completed his habilitation (Privatdozent) at the Universität Ulm.

Career 
Flegel has medical licenses issued by the state of Hessen, Germany and the state of Maryland, and holds certification by the Board of Physicians Baden-Württemberg, specialty transfusion medicine. Clinical appointments included: chief, Department of Immunohematology at the German Red Cross Blood Service Baden-Württemberg - Hessen in Ulm for 16 years. Flegel came to the NIH Clinical Center in 2009 and remains at the NIH as the chief of the Laboratory Services Section in the Department of Transfusion Medicine.

Academic appointments include 
Professor (apl. Prof.) at the Universität Ulm, Adjunct Professor at Georgetown University Medical Center, Washington D.C, and Guest Professor at the Huazhong University of Science and Technology, Wuhan, Hubei, China.

Medical research 
Flegel has received recognition for his research leading to the discovery of the molecular structure of the Rh gene locus and most of the clinically relevant molecular variants in the RHD and RHCE genes. He proved that the weak expression of the D antigen is caused by Rh protein variants, which enabled a precision medicine approach to Rh prophylaxis in pregnancy. This work in collaboration with Franz F. Wagner refuted a scientific opinion that had been taught for decades. He showed the RHCE gene is the ancestral gene at the Rh gene locus and a gene duplication event produced the RHD gene, which encodes the D antigen in humans (Rh positive phenotype). He explained that the prevalent Rh negative phenotype in humans occurred in a subsequent gene deletion event, eliminating the RHD gene.

Other activities

Non-profit organizations 
 Museum of Modern Art, Frankfurt, Member of Freunde des MUSEUMMMK für Moderne Kunst e.V. (since 2006) 
 Friends of the Goethe-Institut Washington D.C. (FoGI, U.S. 501(c)(3) charitable organization), President, Secretary, or Member of the Board (since 2010)

Honors and awards  
 2017 NIH Clinical Center CEO Award
 2015 NIH Clinical Center Director’s Award
 2014 Visiting Professor, Tongji Medical College, Wuhan, Hubei, China
 2012 NIH Clinical Center Director’s Award
 2010 NIH Clinical Center Director’s Award
 2005 Membre d'honneur, Association Suisse de Médecine Transfusionnelle
 2004 Philip-Levine-Preis, Deutsche Gesellschaft für Transfusionsmedizin und Immunhämatologie

Publications  
 W. A. Flegel: Modern Rhesus (Rh) typing in transfusion and pregnancy. CMAJ 2021; 193(4):E124.
 W. A. Flegel: COVID-19: risk of infection is high, independently of ABO blood group. Haematologica 2020; 105(12): 2706-2708.
 W. A. Flegel: COVID-19 insights from transfusion medicine. British J Haematol 2020; 190(5): 715-717.
 W. A. Flegel: Mosaicism by somatic non-functional mutations: one cell lineage at a time. Haematologica. 2019; 104(3):425-427.
 W. A. Flegel: Red cell alloimmunisation: incidence and prevention. Lancet Haematol. 2016; 3(6):e260-1.
 W. A. Flegel: Pathogenesis and mechanisms of antibody-mediated hemolysis. Transfusion. 2015; 55(Suppl 2):S47-58.
 W. A. Flegel: Molecular genetics and clinical applications for RH. Transfus Apher Sci. 2011; 44(1):81-91
 W. A. Flegel: Rare gems: null phenotypes of blood groups. Blood Transfus. 2010; 8(1):2-4.
 W. A. Flegel: The Genetics of the Rhesus Blood Group System. Dtsch Ärztebl. 2007; 104(10): A-651
 W. A. Flegel: Blood group genotyping in Germany. Transfusion. 2007; 47(1 Suppl):47S-53S.
 W. A. Flegel: How I manage donors and patients with a weak D phenotype. Curr Opin Hematol. 2006; 13(6):476-83.
 H.-D. Lippert, W. A. Flegel. Kommentar zum Transfusionsgesetz (TFG) und den Hämotherapie-Richtlinien. 2002. Springer, Berlin, 521 pages.  (Medical-legal textbook interpreting the code of federal regulations for transfusion medicine in Germany)
 W. A. Flegel, F. F. Wagner: Molecular genetics of RH. Vox Sang. 2000; 78(Suppl 2):109-15.
 H. Northoff, W. A. Flegel: Genotyping and phenotyping: the two sides of one coin. Infusionsther Transfusionsmed. 1999;26:5.
 W. A. Flegel, F. F. Wagner, T. H. Müller, C. Gassner: Rh phenotype prediction by DNA typing and its application to practice. Transfus Med. 1998; 8(4):281-302.
 W..A. Flegel, A. W. Singson, J. S. Margolis, A. G. Bang, J. W. Posakony, C. Murre: Dpbx, a new homeobox gene closely related to the human proto-oncogene pbx1 molecular structure and developmental expression. Mech Dev 1993; 41(2-3):155-161.
 W. A. Flegel, A. Wölpl, D. N. Männel, H. Northoff: Inhibition of endotoxin-induced activation of human monocytes by human lipoproteins. Infect Immun 1989; 57(7):2237-2245.

References

External links 

 The phylogeny of 48 alleles, experimentally verified (YouTube-Video 2019)
 The Rhesus Site (Universität Ulm)
 Literature by W A Flegel in the catalogue of the National Library of Medicine (PubMed)
 Interview in Berlin 2010

1960 births
Living people
Goethe University Frankfurt alumni
20th-century German physicians
German medical researchers
21st-century American physicians
National Institutes of Health people
American medical researchers
American geneticists